The Battle of the Bulge was a major World War II German offensive in 1944.

Battle of the Bulge may also refer to:

Literature and film
Battle of the Bulge: Hitler's Alternate Scenarios, an alternate history anthology
Battle of the Bulge (1965 film), an American widescreen epic war film
The Battle of the Bulge... The Brave Rifles, a 1965 documentary film
Battle of the Bulge (1991 film), a Canadian comedy short film
The Battle of the Bulge a 1994 documentary for PBS by Thomas Lennon

Games
Battle of the Bulge (1991 game), a board wargame by Avalon Hill
Axis & Allies: Battle of the Bulge, a 2007 board game by Avalon Hill
Battle of the Bulge (video game), a 2012 IOS historical wargame

Other uses 
Battle of the Bulge, a nickname for weight loss